Rouhollah Zamani (Persian: روح‌الله زمانی; born August 15, 2005) is an Iranian actor. He rose to prominence for his performance as Ali in the 2020 acclaimed drama film Sun Children which was shortlisted at the 93rd Academy Awards for Best Foreign Language Film. He won a Marcello Mastroianni Award, a Children and Youth International Film Festival Award and a Fajr Film Festival Honorary Diploma for his performance.

Filmography

Film

Television

Awards and nominations

References

External links 

 

Iranian child actors
People from Ardabil
Living people
All articles with unsourced statements
2005 births